Ngara Airport  is an airport in northwestern Tanzania serving the town of Ngara.

Including overruns, the runway has  available for takeoff.

See also

 List of airports in Tanzania
 Transport in Tanzania

References

External links
OpenStreetMap - Ngara
OurAirports - Ngara Airport
SkyVector - Ngara Airport

Airports in Tanzania
Buildings and structures in the Kagera Region